Tarapacá Department  may refer to:
 Tarapacá Department (Peru) 1878–1883.
 Tarapacá Department (Chile) 1883–1928, part of Tarapacá Province

Department name disambiguation pages